Sipunculus is a genus of worms belonging to the family Sipunculidae.

The genus has cosmopolitan distribution.

Species:

Sipunculus angasoides 
Sipunculus clavatus 
Sipunculus corallicolus 
Sipunculus echinorhynchus 
Sipunculus gulfus 
Sipunculus indicus 
Sipunculus lomonossovi 
Sipunculus longipapillosus 
Sipunculus macrorhynchus 
Sipunculus marcusi 
Sipunculus microrhynchus 
Sipunculus mundanus 
Sipunculus norvegicus 
Sipunculus nudus 
Sipunculus phalloides 
Sipunculus polymyotus 
Sipunculus robustus 
Sipunculus rubens 
Sipunculus rufofimbriatus 
Sipunculus saccatus 
Sipunculus thailandicus 
Sipunculus zenkevitchi

References

Sipunculans